Lobo is a character appearing in comic books published by DC Comics. He was created by Roger Slifer and Keith Giffen, and first appeared in Omega Men #3 (June 1983). He is an alien from the utopian planet of Czarnia, and he works as an interstellar mercenary and bounty hunter.

Lobo was first introduced as a hardened villain in the 1980s, but he soon fell out of use with writers. He remained in limbo until his revival as a bounty hunter with his own comic in the early 1990s. Writers attempted to use Lobo as a parody of the 1990s trend towards "grim and gritty" superhero stories, but he was instead enthusiastically accepted by fans of the trend. This popularity led to the character having a much higher profile in DC Comics stories from then on, as well as starring roles in various series in the decades since.

Lobo made his live-action debut in the 2019 premiere episode of the second season of the television series Krypton, portrayed by Emmett J. Scanlan.

Character development
The character enjoyed a short run as one of DC's most popular characters throughout the 1990s. This version of Lobo was intended to be a satire of the Marvel Comics superhero Wolverine. In issue #41 of Deadpool, a separate Marvel series, Lobo was parodied as "Dirty Wolff", a large blue-skinned man who drove a demonic motorcycle. He was also parodied in the Image Comics series Bloodwulf and as "Bolo" in the Topps Comics series Satan's Six.

In a 2006 interview, Keith Giffen said: "I have no idea why Lobo took off... I came up with him as an indictment of the Punisher, Wolverine hero prototype, and somehow he caught on as the high violence poster boy. Go figure". He later stated that both Lobo and Ambush Bug were derived from Lunatik, a character he created in high school.

Lobo was the favorite DC Comics character of Stan Lee.

Publication history
Lobo was introduced as a regular character in Keith Giffen and Roger Slifer’s Green Lantern and Teen Titans spin-off The Omega Men. At that time, he was a Velorpian whose entire race had been exterminated by Psions and was partnered with Bedlam, whom he later killed; his origin was later retconned.

After a well-received appearance in Justice League International, Lobo became a regular character in L.E.G.I.O.N. and its successor series R.E.B.E.L.S..

In 1990, he appeared in his own four-issue miniseries, Lobo: The Last Czarnian, plotted by Giffen, written by Alan Grant and with art by Simon Bisley, which changed his origin story: he became the last Czarnian after violently killing every other member of the species. That mini-series led to many subsequent miniseries and specials, including Lobocop, a RoboCop parody; Blazing Chain of Love, in which he is sent on a job to a harem; Paramilitary Christmas Special, in which he is contracted by the Easter Bunny to assassinate Santa Claus; Infanticide, where he kills his daughter and all of his other offspring that she has gathered to try to kill him; Convention Special, a send-up of comic book conventions; and Unamerican Gladiators, in which Lobo takes part in a deadly televised game show. Simon Bisley's dark humor fits well within the pages of his artwork by having countless mutilations of background characters occurring in each panel. Lobo also starred in his own DC title for 64 issues, from 1993 to 1999.

Lobo has regularly made guest appearances in other series, even in cross-company interactions with such non-DC characters as the Mask, Judge Dredd, and the Authority. During the DC vs. Marvel crossover series, he fought Wolverine and lost due to popular vote by the fans. He also appeared very briefly in the JLA/Avengers inter-company crossover and is shown fighting members of the Shi'ar Imperial Guard; although the outcome is not shown, it is mentioned that the Guard had trouble containing him.

Lobo has made a few appearances in the animated series of the 1990s/2000s-era DC Animated Universe. At one point, an animated series and video game starring the character were to be released, but both were cancelled. However, an adult animated black comedy web series was made in 2000 with 14 shorts.

Fictional character biography
Lobo is a Czarnian with exceptional strength and fortitude. He enjoys nothing better than mindless violence and intoxication, and killing as an end in itself; his name roughly translates as "he who devours your entrails and thoroughly enjoys it". He is arrogant and self-centered, focusing almost solely on his own pleasures, although he proudly lives up to the letter of his promises – but always no more or no less than what he promised. Lobo is the last of his kind, having committed complete genocide by killing all the other Czarnians for fun. As detailed in Lobo #0, Lobo unleashed a violent plague of flying scorpions upon his home world, killing most of its citizens.

Physically, Lobo resembles a chalk-white human male with, generally, blood-red pupilless eyes with blackened eyelids. Like many comic book characters, Lobo's body is highly muscular, though his initial appearances were much leaner and less bulky compared to later iterations. Originally portrayed with neatly trimmed purple-grey hair, this was soon redesigned as a gray mane, later a long, straggly, gray-black rocker hair, dreadlocks, and more recently a pompadour. Similarly, the orange-and-purple leotard he wore in his first few appearances was replaced by black leather biker gear and was later replaced with both the robes of his office as a putative Archbishop and pirate-themed gear, then later a sleeveless flight suit/jumpsuit. His arsenal includes numerous guns and a titanium chain with a hook on his right arm. Extra weapons may include "frag grenades" and giant carving blades.

Lobo has a strict personal code of honor in that he will never violate the letter of an agreement, saying in Superman: The Animated Series that "The Main Man's word is his bond", although he may gleefully disregard its spirit. He is surprisingly protective of space dolphins, some of which he feeds from his home. A few have been killed in separate incidents, which he avenges with his usual violence.

Lobo's friends include Dawg, a Bulldog that he often claims is not his when it gets into trouble; Jonas Glim, a fellow bounty hunter; Ramona, a bail bondswoman/hairdresser; and Guy Gardner, whose friendship was cemented when Lobo came by Guy's bar Warriors where he gave Guy one of his Space Hogs and the skull of the Tormock leader Bronkk.

Dawg is stomped to death by Lobo in Lobo (vol. 2) #58, in which he again claims to Superman that the dog is not his; this is for the final time. Somehow, Dawg later appears alongside Lobo when Lobo goes to Earth to fight Green Lantern and Atrocitus. His enemies include the do-gooder superhero parody Goldstar, Loo, Vril Dox, Bludhound, Etrigan the Demon, and General Glory. Lobo generally tries to kill anyone he is hired to capture, including his fourth-grade teacher named Miss Tribb, his children, Santa Claus, and Dawg, although his main targets are Superman and Deathstroke. Lobo frequents a restaurant, Al's Diner, where he often flirts with Al's only waitress, Darlene Spritzer. Though Lobo protects these two from frequent danger, he does not seem to understand the distress caused by his tendency to destroy the diner. Al and Darlene later prosper due to Lobo's appetite for destruction; he destroys the city, except for the diner, leaving hordes of construction workers with only one place to eat lunch. He also ends up destroying a diner Al gives to him as part of a birthday celebration.

The last revelation of Lobo and the diner appears to be in the pages of Lobo (vol. 2) #1,000,000 (November 1998), where his last adventure is depicted. By the time of the action, he is already morbidly obese and working as a carnival attraction, scaring tourists into leaving their money behind. Then, a sexy client appears to offer him one last job: finding a legendary evildoer named Malo Perverso. At the prospect of a last well-paid job and a chance to score with the client, Lobo quickly agrees, and he again invades the diner to use their Tesseract teleporter to reach his gear. It is revealed then the "client" is none other than Darlene, who wanted to see him back in his prime rather than see him sink even deeper into sloth.

After reaching his gear, Lobo invades the HQ of the International Justice Legion Wanna-Bes and crushes all opposition to hack their files on Malo Perverso. There, he is attacked by Perverso himself, who then reveals himself to be Clayman, the team's shapeshifter, who admits he impersonated Perverso to get rid of Lobo. Clayman also squeals that the real Perverso went into a black hole. Lobo, still eager to find his bounty, goes into the black hole. Ironically, due to Lobo's interference in a planetary conflict in the same issue, Al later gets a package through the Tesseract for Lobo – which promptly blows the diner up yet again.

At one point, Lobo has trouble with a clone of himself that had survived previous misadventures. A battle between the two makes it unclear which of them survived. Some fans conclude that the original Lobo was the victor since, later in the series, Lobo removes a miniature radio which he had surgically implanted in his head some time before the clone fight, and only organic matter can be cloned.

The character has participated in several money-making schemes, such as being a priest and being a pop-rock idol. Most of these schemes tend to end with the violent deaths of nearly everyone involved. He has many friends among the bounty hunter world, though many tend to die when they are around Lobo, either by his hand or at the hands of the enemies he faces.

Crossovers 
Lobo has both clashed and cooperated with Superman. He has also encountered Batman a couple of times, although one of these encounters was in an Elseworlds continuity. He has both fought and teamed up with Guy Gardner more than once, helping him to destroy various alien threats to Earth. Lobo often visits Warriors, Guy's bar, where he enjoys free drinks.

He fights Aquaman when a traveling space dolphin visiting Earth is killed by Japanese fishermen. He ceases fighting when he learns Aquaman is not only a friend to dolphins, but was raised by them. Although Lobo feels he cannot hurt a fellow dolphin lover, he has no such mercy for the fishermen.

Lobo also has appeared with the Authority. In one such appearance, Jenny Quantum finds a comic book detailing Lobo's murder of Santa Claus; she experiences a fit of rage and confusion. She breaks the barrier between her dimension and the dimension Lobo inhabits in the comic book, and Lobo finds himself in a fight with the Authority.

Lobo has also had run-ins with Hitman, Valor, Starman, the Ray, Deadman, Green Lantern, the JLA, StormWatch, Mister Miracle, the Legion of Super-Heroes, Captain Marvel, Wonder Woman, Fate, the Sovereign Seven, Supergirl, and Superboy, among others.

L.E.G.I.O.N./R.E.B.E.L.S.

Lobo acts as an independent bounty hunter until tricked by Vril Dox into nominally joining his interstellar police force, L.E.G.I.O.N. However, he continues solo activity, which seems to often bring him to Earth and in conflict with its heroes. Or, as in one case, base indifference. He remains loyal to Vril Dox after L.E.G.I.O.N. leadership is usurped by Dox's son, until an altercation between Lobo and Dox prompts Dox to release Lobo from his service. After this, Lobo becomes a full-time bounty hunter again.

Li'l Lobo
In the year 2000, a magical accident transforms Lobo into a teenager. In this condition, he joins Young Justice and eventually accompanies them to Apokolips, where he is killed in combat. However, the aforementioned magical accident has restored his ability to grow clones from a single drop of blood, and millions of Lobos rush into battle against Apokoliptian soldiers, whom the Lobos quickly defeat. The Lobos then turn on each other, until only one is left; in the process, the surviving Lobo regrows to adulthood. His time as a member of Young Justice becomes a distant memory. An additional weaker teenage Lobo with yellow eyes remained, however, having hidden from the fight; he rejoins Young Justice and chooses to rename himself Slobo ("[It]'s Lobo"). Eventually, this clone begins to degrade, becoming blind and degenerating to the brink of death. Before he can die, however, Darkseid teleports him to the headquarters of Young Justice One Million in the 853rd Century, turning him into a statue, fully conscious and aware, in the process. When Lobo later encounters Robin and Wonder Girl again as members of the Teen Titans, he demonstrates no recollections of them or their history together, demonstrating that he has indeed forgotten his time as their teammate.

52
In the 2006–07 miniseries 52, Lobo reappears after an extended hiatus. He encounters a group of heroes (consisting of Adam Strange, Animal Man, and Starfire), who find themselves stranded in space after the events of the 2005–2006 "Infinite Crisis" storyline. To everyone's surprise, he does not kill them. Lobo professes to have found religion, becoming the spiritual leader of the whole of sector 3500, which was left in shambles by a still-unknown assailant. He is the current caretaker of the Emerald Eye of Ekron. After helping the lost heroes defeat Lady Styx, he brings the Emerald Eye to the triple-headed fish god, who agrees to release Lobo from his vow of non-violence in exchange. When told that the Emerald Eye is the only thing that can kill the fish god, Lobo blasts him with it.

One Year Later
Lobo appeared in "Deadly Serious", a two-part crossover miniseries with Batman in August 2007, written and drawn by Sam Kieth. In addition, Lobo has fought the Teen Titans and Blue Beetle in their respective titles to stop a rocket for the Reach, in which he failed.

In the Reign in Hell miniseries, it is revealed that Lobo's soul was still in Hell following a deal he made with Neron during the 1995 Underworld Unleashed storyline. Lobo's suffering was enough to power Neron's whole castle. Lobo was freed from his prison in a battle between Etrigan the Demon and Blue Devil, and he went on a rampage through Hell to seek revenge on Neron. To buy time to fully recover before battling Lobo, Etrigan stole Blue Devil's soul and informed him that he would have to fight Lobo to get it back. During Lobo's rampage he cut off Zatara's head, forcing his daughter, Zatanna, to send him to the Abyss, the soul death.

Later, Lobo is shown aiding the JLA during their mission into Hell, where he helps Fire defeat the god Plutus.

"Brightest Day"
In the 2010 "Brightest Day" storyline, Lobo appears on Earth to capture a bounty on Atrocitus's head. After fighting Hal Jordan, Carol Ferris and Sinestro, he then flees. It is revealed that the fight was staged by Atrocitus himself. As a payment, Lobo is given a Red Lantern ring.

R.E.B.E.L.S.
Still wearing his red ring on a chain around his neck, Lobo is recruited from a bar by Vril Dox, who requires his help battling his "father" Brainiac and Pulsar Stargrave, a captured weapon. Even losing his spacehog, Lobo saves the planet Colu, but with Brainac and Pulsar Stargrave escaping. Lobo became a senior member of Vril Dox's Legion based on the planet Rann. Lobo was the key to defeating Starro the Conqueror and his lieutenants, ensuring security for Rann, the Vega system and the galaxy. Unknown to Lobo, the Psions had created clones of Lobo attempting to bring back the Czarnian race, which could make them unstoppable, but the series ended before this was played out.

The New 52

In 2011, DC Comics rebooted the DC Universe continuity in an initiative called The New 52. A reimagined version of Lobo debuted in Deathstroke (vol. 2) #9, written by Rob Liefeld. This Lobo is a Czarnian slaver who killed the rest of his race except for his beloved Princess Sheba. A second version, claiming to be the real Lobo and resembling more his original Post-Crisis version, unlike the redesigned Lobo, was introduced in Justice League (vol. 2) #23.2. Cultured and well-educated, although ruthless, this Lobo is an interstellar mercenary and bounty hunter, with a leaner physique akin to the character's earlier appearances. This new version sets course for Earth after discovering his counterpart, a Czarnian impostor, had been there. According to this version's backstory, Lobo was originally the bodyguard to the Czarnian royal family, who utilized a Eucharist-like ritual involving the planet's "life blood", pools similar to the Lazarus Pits. Drinking or bathing in these pools granted participants regenerative abilities, connecting them and the Emperor himself to the entire planet. However, an unknown party contaminated the "life blood", causing the Czarnian Emperor and any citizenry that had participated in the ritual to go insane, which in turn forced Lobo to commit planetary euthanasia. A new series featuring this version of Lobo debuted in October 2014 and concluded with its December 2015 issue.

DC Rebirth
In 2016, DC Comics implemented another relaunch of its books called DC Rebirth, which restored its continuity to a form much as it was prior to The New 52. Lobo debuts in Justice League vs. Suicide Squad as one of the villains freed by Maxwell Lord, evidently restored to his Pre-New 52 persona. He is a member of Amanda Waller's first Suicide Squad. Batman eventually implants a bomb into Lobo's brain and detonates it, blowing up Lobo's head. After Lobo regenerates it, he discovers Batman did so to free him from Lord's control, and he later accepts Batman's offer to join a new incarnation of the Justice League to repay the favour. In Hal Jordan and the Green Lantern Corps, the New 52 incarnation of Lobo is shown to be held captive inside one of Brainiac 2.0's bottles. Guy Gardner almost frees him, before Hal Jordan grabs the bottle and tells him it is better to "leave him on the shelf".

Powers and abilities
In all comic books, Lobo is portrayed as a ruthless bounty hunter. He only has one rule: once he takes a contract, he finishes it no matter what, even if it means risking injury. If he has a counter-contract for even more money, then he will fulfill the new one.

Lobo possesses extraordinary strength of undefined limits. His strength, much like his other powers, varies greatly depending upon different artistic interpretations by various comic book writers. In some instances, he is depicted as being barely stronger than a human while, in others, he demonstrates physical strength on a similar level to Superman. He has shown to be a match in strength for Etrigan the Demon each time that they have met.

Lobo also possesses superhuman durability, which varies greatly too. Lobo is depicted, in some situations, as being injured by conventional bullets while, in other situations, he has the physical resiliency to stand toe to toe with Superman, survive unprotected in deep space, and withstand high level destructive weaponry and powerful explosive blasts without sustaining injury. He has displayed particular susceptibility to gaseous chemicals. In one instance, Lobo was declared immortal; after he died and went to Hell, he proved too much for the demons and, when he was then sent to Heaven, he wreaked so much havoc that he was permanently banished from the afterlife.

If Lobo sustains injury, his accelerated healing factor enables him to regenerate damaged or destroyed tissue with superhuman speed and efficiency and little apparent pain. Lobo also is functionally immortal. He is immune to the effects of aging and disease. As such, even though he can sustain sufficient injury to be out of commission for quite some time, he will apparently heal from any injury, given sufficient time. For instance, Lobo can regenerate out of a pool of his own blood, apparently recycling the cells.

At one time, Lobo could grow a copy of himself, possessing all of his skills and powers, out of every drop of his blood that was spilled. This power was removed by Vril Dox during Lobo's time with L.E.G.I.O.N., but Lobo regained it in the series Young Justice, in which he was de-aged by Klarion the Witch Boy and slaughtered while on a mission to Apokolips. His blood reformed into thousands of Lobo clones who waged war on the planet and then proceeded to murder each other until only one Lobo (the current one) was left. One of his other clones, Slobo, survived, but later began to fall apart until being dealt with by Darkseid. In 52, he again regenerated from a pool of blood, but no clones were created, so he no longer appears to retain this ability.

Lobo possesses an amazingly developed sense of smell, which allows him to track objects between solar systems, as well as a separate tracking ability enabling him to track an individual across galactic distances.

He is a formidable combatant with expertise in multiple forms of armed and unarmed combat. His favorite weapon is a large titanium alloy chain with a large gutting hook connected at the end, often referred to as "the garrote", that he keeps wrapped around his right wrist. At times, he also uses high-grade explosives and advanced firearms.

Despite his violent and loutish nature, Lobo seems to have a genius-level intellect in matters of destruction and violence. He can create complex virulent agents and the corresponding antidotes. In one version of his backstory, he released such a plague on Czarnia as a school science project. This resulted in the deaths of the entire population in the span of one week, he then proceeded to give himself an "A".

Lobo has extraordinary speed, rivaling the Flash.

Lobo was blessed with the power of detecting weaknesses in any enemy, just by looking at it.

His vehicle, some sort of space-faring motorcycle (the "Space Hog"), often accompanies him. It is of his own design and, despite its size, it is capable of extended and speedy travel throughout space. Further, it protects those in its immediate vicinity from the hazards of space and somehow permits the ability to breathe and speak. He was also able to scavenge parts from a destroyed time hopper and attach them to his own bike, producing a working time machine. Lobo is fluent in many alien languages (according to Lobo, 17,897) and extremely knowledgeable in the locations and cultures of worlds without external references. Lobo is known for his awkward behavior and love for cigars. He was once known to destroy an entire planet for not finding the cigar of his liking.

It is not fully known the extent to which his powers are common for his race or unique to him. In the miniseries The Last Czarnian and elsewhere, it is stated that the cloning and healing abilities are traits possessed by all Czarnians, as is the apparent ability to survive in the vacuum of space. Before the reboot, Lobo was granted a Red Lantern Power Ring by Atrocitous during the "Brightest Day" storyline.

Czarnia
Czarnia is a fictional planet, the homeworld of DC Comics character Lobo before he wiped out the entire planet's race. The last Czarnian can be seen in series Lobo: The Last Czarnian by Simon Bisley and Keith Giffen. Czarnia no longer exists in the DC Universe.

Contrary to the personality of their "last son", the Czarnians were a peaceful race. Czarnia was in a golden age and had become a crime-free utopia that rivaled Krypton. They had many social institutions just like Earth, such as day care, music concerts and mental asylums.

More focus on Czarnian civilization is shown in the novel DC Universe: Last Sons and Lobo (vol. 2) Annual #3 (1995).

The Czarnians, the former inhabitants of Czarnia, are described as a very peaceful society, unused to social unrest. They were wiped out after Lobo bio-engineers a small flying scorpion-like creature with a lethal sting and unleashes it on Czarnia. Death from the stings is very slow.

Lobo believes he was the only remaining Czarnian, but in Simon Bisley and Keith Giffen's miniseries entitled Lobo: The Last Czarnian, he discovers that this was not quite the case. One Czarnian was off-world when he unleashed his plague and, by coincidence, it happened to be his fourth grade teacher, Miss Tribb.

Lobo happens to be under contract to deliver Miss Tribb to his employer Vril Dox, a very sensitive situation. Lobo takes his promises very seriously; he keeps his reputation by keeping his word. He keeps her alive, though at one point he removes her legs to keep her from wandering off. When he fulfills his contract by bringing her to Vril Dox, he then immediately kills her by snapping her neck.

The story of Czarnia is very well-known across the universe, due to the publication of a Lobo biography. This book is featured in Lobo (vol. 2) #0 (October 1994), discussed by several crooks who are being pursued by Lobo himself.

The planet later became the site of an assassination attempt on Lobo, which is detailed in the miniseries "Lobo: Infanticide". Hundreds of his children, results of his womanizing, form a battalion to ambush him. Lobo, thinking he is taking part in war games, patrols through various Czarnian canyons, even encountering his old house, which is still somewhat standing.

Most of his children are slain in a battle with the "Brutish" empire, a race of aliens who had decided to take the empty planet for their own. Lobo kills the invading force, then spends much time battling the last of his kids. These fights take place in a highly arid region, with little plant life. Eventually, he is the sole survivor. The planet suffers much damage in the battles.

Other versions
 In the two-part Lobo vs. the Mask crossover, Lobo is hired for the sum of 1 billion credits by a council of survivors of several devastated planets to track down the individual responsible. His trail leads to Earth, where Lobo encounters the current wearer of an ancient mask. The resulting battle destroys Manhattan and leaves Lobo as nothing but a severed head, waiting for his body to regenerate. Big Head, convincing Lobo he wants the previous mask wearer, agrees to a team-up to hunt the "Ultimate Bastich" down. Big Head leads Lobo on a chase to nowhere, killing even more and blowing up a solar system in the process. Fed up with Big Head, Lobo uses a special "guilt grenade" to force the wearer to remove the mask so that he can use it himself. Lobo promptly kills an entire intergalactic bar full of aliens and is sucked into a wormhole on his ride through space. Landing in parts unknown, Lobo/Mask heads to a single planet where, crashing the 400th annual Feel Good Games, he insults a king and proceeds to kill numerous people. A crayon drawing left on his bike with the words "YOU SMELL" incurs his wrath, and he destroys numerous planets hunting down the one who drew the insulting picture. Waking up one day, Lobo finds himself back on Earth, and he realizes the mask used him. Tossing it away, he leaves, only to pass himself arriving on Earth. As it turns out, the wormhole sent him back in time roughly one month. He had been hired to hunt himself, and the alley where he dumped the mask was the same alley where the pickpocket would find it in Part 1. However, Lobo breaks the time loop, literally turning himself in as he shaves the other Lobo's head and paints him green for the reward money. Meanwhile, Big Head, realizing that Lobo has broken the loop, decides to have fun of its own on Earth.
 In the Amalgam Comics universe, Lobo is crossed with Howard the Duck to become Lobo the Duck.
 "Coach Lobo" sends the Tiny Titans on a race around the world in issue #16 of that series. In a tirade about the laziness of his students, Lobo reveals that, "Back on my planet, when I was a kid, I had to run to school uphill both ways!...Uphill in the rain and snow together! Volcanoes were erupting all around us! Dolphins were everywhere! All we had for fun was exercise!" Coach Lobo also appeared in issues #18, 22, 32, 41 and 45.

In other media

Television

Animation

 Lobo appears in series set in the DC Animated Universe (DCAU), voiced by Brad Garrett. Due to Broadcast Standards and Practices, this version's self-healing and advanced senses are not shown and his gutting hook is not used for combat.
 Lobo first appears in Superman: The Animated Series. In the two-part episode "The Main Man", he is hired by an alien named the "Preserver" to capture Superman and add him to the Preserver's collection of rare and endangered species. After the Preserver decides to add Lobo as well upon realizing he is also the last of his own species, the latter and Superman join forces to escape, with Lobo promising to leave Earth alone in return. Lobo also makes a cameo appearance at the end of the episode "Warrior Queen".
 Lobo returns in the Justice League two-part episode "Hereafter". Upon hearing of Superman's apparent death, Lobo approaches the Justice League to take up the former's leadership role. The Leaguers reluctantly agree amidst their efforts to stop several supervillains running amok until Superman, who had been sent to the future, returns to the present and ousts Lobo.
 An adult animated streaming television series released in 2000 titled Lobo featured the titular character, voiced by Greg Eagles and Kevin Michael Richardson.
 Lobo makes a cameo appearance in the Legion of Super Heroes episode "Legacy".
 Lobo appears in Young Justice, voiced by David Sobolov.
 Lobo appears in Justice League Action, voiced by John DiMaggio.

Live action
Lobo appears in the second season of Krypton, portrayed by Emmett J. Scanlan. This version displays a vendetta against Brainiac, who destroyed his home planet and stole his home city. A spin-off series focusing on Lobo was announced to be in development, with Scanlan reprising his role, but did not proceed following the cancellation of Krypton.

Film

Live-action
In September 2009, Warner Bros. announced that Guy Ritchie would direct a live-action adaptation of Lobo. Variety described the premise: "Lobo is a seven-foot tall, blue-skinned, indestructible and heavily muscled antihero who drives a pimped out motorcycle, and lands on Earth in search of four fugitives who are bent on wreaking havoc. Lobo teams with a small town teenage girl to stop the creatures". Ritchie was scheduled to begin production of Lobo in early 2010 and bring an "irreverent, gruff tone" to the film as he did with previous films Lock, Stock and Two Smoking Barrels and Snatch, though the studio was reportedly aiming for a PG-13 rating from the Motion Picture Association of America. In early 2010, Ritchie left the project to pursue working on a sequel to his film Sherlock Holmes instead. The future of the Lobo film was then put on hold. In 2012, Brad Peyton was reportedly attached to write and direct the film. In July, Dwayne Johnson was in talks with Joel Silver and Brad Peyton to portray Lobo, but in February of the following year, Johnson left the project to play Black Adam, in Shazam. Jason Fuchs was later hired to write the Lobo film's script. Later in February 2018, DC Films began eyeing Michael Bay to direct the film after being inspired by the success of Tim Miller's Deadpool film, but only if Bay agrees to direct under the right budget.

Non-theatrical release

In 2002, Scott Leberecht directed a film adaptation of The Lobo Paramilitary Christmas Special as part of the American Film Institute's director's studies program. Andrew Bryniarski stars as Lobo, with Tom Gibis as the Easter Bunny and Michael V. Allen as Santa Claus. The film was made with a budget of $2,400, although many professionals donated time and effort. It premiered at the AFI in May 2002.

Animation
 An Earth-Three version of Lobo called Warwolf makes a cameo appearance in Justice League: Crisis on Two Earths as one of the Crime Syndicate of America's Made-Men under Johnny Quick's command.
 Lobo appears in Lego DC Comics Super Heroes: Aquaman: Rage of Atlantis, voiced by Fred Tatasciore.
 Lobo appears in the mid-credits of Lego DC: Shazam!: Magic and Monsters, voiced again by Fred Tatasciore.
 Lobo appears in DC Super Hero Girls: Intergalactic Games, voiced by Tom Kenny. 
 Lobo appears in Superman: Man of Tomorrow, voiced by Ryan Hurst.

Video games
 In 1995, Ocean Software was developing a Lobo game for the Atari Jaguar CD, Mega Drive/Genesis, and Super NES. It was a fighting game, featuring many characters from Lobo's comic stories. A six-page preview of the game was featured in the video game magazine Nintendo Power, Volume 84 (May 1996). As previewed, the game still had some bugs and lacked sound. Reviews of the finished Genesis version appeared in GamePro and Electronic Gaming Monthly. The reviewers panned the game as having poorly drawn characters, jerky special moves, and a single-player mode in which only Lobo is playable. The game was canceled before its release. A prototype of the finished Genesis version has been found and a ROM image of it was released on September 15, 2009 by a Spanish Sega community, while a prototype of the Super Nintendo version was also found and a ROM image of it was released on February 10, 2016 at the AssemblerGames community.
 Lobo appears as a downloadable playable character in Injustice: Gods Among Us, voiced again by David Sobolov. In his arcade ending, Lobo has become one of the richest men in the galaxy from hunting enemies of the Regime, but soon hits a dry spell and decides to challenge himself by hunting the New Gods.
 Lobo appears as a playable character in DC Unchained.

Lego
 Lobo appears as a playable character in Lego Batman 3: Beyond Gotham, voiced by Travis Willingham.
 Lobo appears as an unlockable playable character in Lego DC Super-Villains, voiced again by David Sobolov. Additionally, Lobo serves as the narrator for a series of bonus missions starring the Justice League, which he does while terrorizing a space diner, and some DLC levels.

Literature
Lobo appears in the novel DC Universe: Last Sons, written by Alan Grant and published in 2006.

See also
 List of Superman enemies

References

External links
 
 
 Lobo's secret origin on DC Comics.com
 ROM image of the unreleased Lobo video game for Genesis

Lobo (DC Comics)
Comics characters introduced in 1983
1990 comics debuts
DC Comics aliens
DC Comics characters who can move at superhuman speeds
DC Comics characters with accelerated healing
DC Comics characters with superhuman senses
DC Comics characters with superhuman strength
DC Comics extraterrestrial superheroes
DC Comics extraterrestrial supervillains
DC Comics male superheroes
DC Comics male supervillains
DC Comics titles
Fictional bounty hunters
Fictional characters with slowed ageing
Fictional characters with immortality
Fictional characters with superhuman durability or invulnerability
Fictional characters who can duplicate themselves
Fictional characters who have made pacts with devils
Fictional chain fighters
Fictional marksmen and snipers
Fictional mass murderers
Fictional mercenaries in comics
Fictional sole survivors
Characters created by Keith Giffen
Parody superheroes
Suicide Squad members
Supervillains with their own comic book titles